HD 61772 is a bright giant star in the constellation Puppis. Its apparent magnitude is 4.98 and it is approximately 660 light years away based on parallax.

The apparent Flamsteed designation 140 Puppis is actually a shorthand of the Gould designation 140 G. Puppis, unambiguous in this case.

The spectrum of HD 61772 match that of a K3II star, a cool bright giant. It has evolved away from the main sequence after about 1.3 billion years and is now 61 times the size of the Sun.

References

Puppis
K-type bright giants
Puppis, 140
BD-14 2082
037379
2959
061772